Sasaramsometimes also spelled as Sahasram, is an ancient historical city and a municipal corporation region in the Rohtas district of the Bihar state in eastern India, with a history that goes to thousands of years. During the prehistoric age, Buddha walked through this way and lived for some days and then travelled to Gaya to be enlightened with verity and wisdom under the Mahabodhi tree, the city is also known as gateway of "Vihar" to visit rest  "Bihar" including Gaya, Rajgriha, and Nalanda.

It has also served as the capital of the Sur dynasty during Shershah Suri ruled over India in 16th Century, and was residence place sub capital of epic monarch Sahstrabahu (Kartivirya Arjuna). The Rohtasgarh fort, one of the world's oldest forts, has served as the capital for several dynasties, Britishers and other rulers, including Shershah Suri and Akbar Governor King Man Singh, as well as the Shashanka and Kharvar empires. The historical fort has been linked to both political and revolutionary activities. It is not only Bihar's, even India's, oldest fort. It was also Shershah Suri's capital palace when he ruled India.

Sasaram and the Kaimur mountain range is a nature's blessed land now a prime hot tourist destination for nature's lovers, enriched by numerous spectacular waterfalls, lakes, rivers and picturesque locations as it is described by Ain-I-Akbari it has over 200 waterfalls emerges during rainy season and few among them are extremely exotic gorgeous to explore.i.e. Dharohar - Karamchat Waterfall, Geetaghat Heaven Holy Waterfall, Panari Ghat/Gaurav Waterfalls, Manjharkund, Dhuvan Kund, Sitakund, Kashish, Mahadev Khoh & Tutla Bhavani Waterfalls are among the most famous. Telhar Kund, Karkat Garh, Mundeshwari Waterfall, Bansi Khoh, Netua Kund, and Chandradhari Waterfalls are also well known in the nearby city in Kaimur Mountain range.

Modern Sasaram city covers the largest sub-metropolitan area of Bihar. It has many famous religious and historical spots to visit such as Shershah tomb, Rohtasgarh fort, Indrapuri Dam, Karamchat Dam Shergarh fort, Kandhar fort, Sacred Tarachandi Shaktipith, Bhaluni dham, Mahadev Khoh, Chaurasan temple, Gupta Dham, Tutla Bhawani temple, Pilot Baba Dham, Godaila Pahad Temple, Anicat Dam, Eco park and the many, the entire district is surrounded by the most scenic mountain beauty of Kaimur range, rivers and productive fields.

Sasaram city is located in the middle of its other sub-towns like Nokha & Kudra which has a large number of agriculture based industries and the city is also emerging as an educational hub. It is situated in the middle of other industrial twin towns like Dehri-on-sone, Dalmianagar, Sonnagar, Amjhor, Nokha and Banjari.

The main posh places of the sub-metropolitan area are Raj Colony, Gauraxni, New Area, Takiya bazar, Tomb Area and Fazalganj commercial zones, Sahu Cinemax - Mall & Railway cricket stadium area. Several malls have been opened along with the best 3-4 star hotels with good medical facilities in the city and is a medical hub of old Shahabad District too.

Sasaram city Region is the administrative headquarters of Rohtas District, Bihar India. It became a district carved out from Shahabad District in 1972. This district headquarter is best known for having the highest literacy rate and highest agricultural & forest cover area of Bihar. Sasaram is also the headquarters of a community development block of the same name, with a total population of 358,283 as of 2011, making it the most populous block in Rohtas district.

It is known for the production of cement, fertilizers, stone chips, and for the quarrying industry and also Sasaram district is popularly known as the "bowl of rice".

Major languages spoken in this region are Bhojpuri, Hindi, English and Urdu; religions include Hinduism, Islam, Buddhism, Christianity, Sikhism, and Jainism.

History

During the Vedic age, Sasaram was a part of the ancient Kashi kingdom. Sasaram name is originated from the Sahastrarama, meaning a thousand groves. Sasaram was once also named Shah Serai (meaning "Place of King") as it is the birthplace of the Afghan king Sher Shah Suri, who ruled over Delhi, much of northern India, what is now Pakistan, and eastern Afghanistan for five years, after defeating the Mughal Emperor Humayun. Many of Sher Shah Suri's governmental practices were adopted by the Mughals and the British Raj including taxation, administration, and the building of a paved road from Kabul to Bengal, also called the Grand Trunk Road.

Sher Shah Suri's  red sandstone tomb, built in the Indo-Afghan style stands in the middle of an artificial lake in Sasaram. It borrows heavily from the Lodhi style, and was once covered in blue and yellow glazed tiles indicating an Iranian influence. The massive free standing dome also has an aesthetic aspect of the Buddhist stupa style of the Mauryan period. The tomb of Sher Shah's father Hasan Khan Suri is also at Sasaram, and stands in the middle of a green field at Sherganj, which is known as Sukha Rauza. About a kilometer to the north west of Sher Shah's tomb lies the incomplete and dilapidated tomb of his son and successor, Islam Shah Suri. Sasaram also has a Baulia, a pool used by the emperor's consorts for bathing.

The fort of Sher Shah Suri at Rohtasgarh is in Sasaram. This fort has a history dating back to the 7th century AD. It was built by Raja Harishchandra, known for his truthfulness in the name of his son Rohitashwa. It houses the Churasan temple, Ganesh temple, diwan-e khas, diwan-e-aam, and various other structures dating back to different centuries. The fort also served as the headquarters of Raja Man Singh during his reign as the governor of Bihar and Bengal under the regime of Akbar. The Rohtaas fort in Bihar should not be confused with another fort of the same name, near Jhelum, Punjab, in what is now Pakistan. The Rohtaas fort in Sasaram was also built by Sher Shah Suri, during the period when Humayun was exiled from Hindustan.

There is a temple of Goddess Tarachandi, two miles to the south, and an inscription of Pratap Dhawal on the rock close to the temple of Chandi Devi. Hindus in large number assemble to worship the goddess.

There are several monuments near Sasaram, the headquarter of Rohtas district, including Akbarpur, Deomarkandey, Rohtas Garh, Shergarh, TaraChandi, Dhuwan Kund, Gupta Dham, Bhaluni Dham, Historical Gurudwara and Tombs of Chandan Shaheed, Hasan Khan Sur, Sher Shah, Salim Sah and Alawal Khan.

Rohtas, south of Sasaram, is known to have been the residence of one Satyawadi Raja Harischandra, named for his son, Rohitashwa.

Minor Rock Edict of Ashoka
Sasaram is also famous for an inscription by Ashoka (one of the thirteen Minor Rock Edicts), situated in a small cave of Kaimur hill, near Chandan Shaheed.

The edict is located near the top of the terminal spur of the Kimur Range near Sasaram. There is the Minor rock edict #1 only Ashoka famously mentions pre-existing stone pillars in the Edict: "...And where there are stone pillars here in my dominion, there also cause it to be engraved.".

Tomb of Sher Shah Suri

Coordinates: 

This site is included in UNESCO World Heritage Centre – Tentative list.

Tomb of Sher Shah, built in the middle of the town, is one of the noblest specimens of Pathan architecture in India, is an imposing structure of stone, standing in the middle of a fine tank, and was built towards the middle of sixteenth century. The octagon forming the tomb has an interior diameter of  feet and an exterior diameter of  feet. The tomb is the second highest in India which attracts tourists. The tomb of Shershah Suri at Sasaram is an imposing structure of stone standing in the middle of a fine tank and rising from a large stone terrace. This terrace rests obliquely on a platform with a flight of steps leading to the water's edge. The upper terrace is enclosed by a battlemented parapet wall with octagonal domed chambers at four corners, two small projecting pillared balconies on each of its four sides and pierced with a doorway in the east forms the only approach to the tomb. In the middle of the upper terrace stands the building of the mausoleum on a low octagonal plinth. The building consists of a very large octagonal chamber surrounded by a wide verandah on al the four sides. Internally, the verandah is covered by a series of 24 small domes, each supported on four arches but as the roof is a pillared cupola adorned by panels of white glazed tiles now much discoloured. The tomb chamber has three lofty arches on each of the eight sides. They rise  higher than the verandah roof and support the magnificent and lofty dome which is one of the largest domes in India. Surrounding the main dome are eight pillared cupolas on the corners of the octagon of the chamber walls. The interior of the tomb is sufficiently well ventilated and lighted through large windows on the top portion of the walls fitted with stone jalis in varying patterns. The jambs and spandrils of the arch of the mihrab on the western wall were once profusely adorned with verses from the Quran and inscriptions, with glazed tiles of various colours arranged in geometrical patterns and with floral carvings in stone enclosed in enamel borders. Much of this decoration has vanished already. Traces of similar decoration in enamel or glazed tile works are also to be scen on the interior of the dome, the walls and the cupolas on the outside. In a small arched recess above the mihrab on the outside wall is an inscription in two lines recording the completion of the tomb by his son and successor Salim or Islam Shah, some three months after the death of Sher Shah who died in A.H. 952 (A.D.1545). It is second largest dome of India.

The tomb of Hasan Khan Sur, father of Sher Shah is also located in the town. This tomb is also known as Sukha Roza.

Geography

Climate
As Sasaram is surrounded by hills from two sides, its climate is seasonable. The climate is characterized by relatively high temperatures and evenly distributed precipitation throughout the year. The Köppen Climate Classification sub-type for this climate is "Cfa" (Humid Subtropical Climate).

Demographics

As of 2020 India census, Sasaram had a population of 351,408 but in urban agglomeration. Males constitute 52% of the population and females 48%. Sasaram has an average literacy rate of 80.26%, higher than the national average of 74%; male literacy is 85%, and female literacy is 75%. In Sasaram, 13% of the population is under 6 years of age.

Sasaram is the 10th most populous city in bihar.

Governance

SAHAJ Vasudha Kendra, the first "Common Service Centre", or "eKiosk", in Rohtas District was inaugurated in Jamuhar village on 15 August 2008. The centre is currently planning to start a block information Centre, e-district plan, and Sawan Sasaram.

Lok Sabha constituency

Sasaram (Lok Sabha constituency) is one of the 40 Lok Sabha (parliamentary) constituencies in Bihar state in eastern India.

Vidhan Sabha constituency
Sasaram (Vidhan Sabha constituency) is one of 243 legislative assembly of Bihar. It is comes under Sasaram lok sabha constituency.

Economy

The closure of the industries of the Dalmia Group at Dalmianagar resulted in widespread unemployment. Sasaram's economy is mainly driven by agriculture and related industries like rice polishing. The canal irrigation system is also very prominent in this area. Because of the fertile land around the town it is a local trading center for food grains, agricultural products, and agricultural equipment. The region is known as Dhan Ka Katora, meaning "a bowl of food grains". The rice grown near Sasaram is sold in the markets of Kolkata and New Delhi. The only significant industry is rock quarrying.

Transportation

Road
Sasaram is well connected both by road and railways. The NH 19 (old number: NH 2; Grand Trunk Road) passes through the city. The main mode of local transportation are buses operated by both private operators and the state government. The private buses are more frequent and connected to most of the local bazaars.  NH 19 connects Delhi in the north-west via Varanasi, Mirzapur, Allahabad, Kanpur and Kolkata in East via Gaya, Dhanbad.

There are also many AC buses available for Sasaram to New Delhi, Patna, Bokaro, Ranchi, Tata.

Railway

Sasaram has a big size railway junction. The station belongs to A class category with 8 platforms. The station has to be developed as the world-class which is located at the centre of the city on the Grand Trunk Road. Sasaram's other stations are Shivsagar, kumahu, Nokha,  Karwandiya, Pahleja and Dehri on Sone.

Sasaram station is 101 Kilometers away from Pt. Trains run from Sasaram to Kolkata, Ara, Ranchi, Patna, New Delhi, and Bikramganj, Bombay.

The trains which stop in Sasaram include Ajmer seldah, Kalka Mail, Purushottam Express, Mahabodhi Express, Ranchi Garib Rath, Kolkata Mail, Jodhpur Howrah Express, Chambal Express, Shipra Express, Chennai Egmore Express, Nandan Kanan Express, Neelanchal Express and Poorva Express, Jallianwalabagh Express, Durigana Express, Garbha Express, Dikshabhoomi Express and New Delhi-  Bhagalpur Express, etc.

A direct weekly AC train had been started from Sasaram to Anand Vihar Terminal in July 2011 (22409/22410 - Sasaram - Anand Vihar Garib Rath Express). However, now this AC train runs between Gaya and Anand Vihar Terminal, still stopping at Sasaram Junction.

Airport
Sasaram has also a small and old airport called Suara Airport. A new airport is proposed to be established in near future.

Education
Sasaram is the sixth most literate city in Bihar, with Rohtas being the most literate district in Bihar.

There are four government colleges, although many students prefer to go to more developed cities for quality education, such as Bangalore, New Delhi, Pune, Patna, Varanasi and Puducherry, for higher education. A new engineering college has been set up in the region.

This Place is also known for preparation of competitive exams at Sasaram Railway junction. According to earlier natives of this city, there was not proper electrification of city around 2007 - 2008 which hampered the studies of students seeking for competitive exams. Indian Railways had 24 hours power supply at Sasaram junction. This led a small group of students to study there at night under electric lights.

Universities
 Gopal Narayan Singh University,
Veer Kunwar Singh University,

Medical colleges
 Narayan Medical College and Hospital
 Mahatma Phule Medical College and Hospital, Muradabad, Sasaram
 Sher Shah Suri Medical Hospital & Training college, Sasaram

Government colleges
 Shanti Prasad Jain College, Sasaram [a facilitation branch of Veer Kunwar Singh University, Arrah ],
 Shri Shankar College, Sasaram
 Sher Shah College, Sasaram
 Rohtas Mahila College, Sasaram

Other colleges
 Hari Narain Singh Institute of Teachers Education (HNSITE)
 Sri Shankar Rajkiya Inter College
 Government Polytechnic, Dehri, Sasaram
 Jagannath Mishra Law College, Sasaram

Major schools
 St.Michael's Academy School, Chandravanshi Nagar, Fazalganj, Sasaram
 M. P. High School, Adda Road, Sasaram
 Rama Rani Jain Girls High School, Choukhandi Road, Sasaram
 Bal Vikas Vidyalaya, Tomb Road, Sasaram
 Bal Bharti Public School, Sasaram
 D.A.V. Public school, Admapur, Sasaram
 St. Paul's School, Sasaram
 St. Xavier's School, Jagdev Nagar, Nooran Ganj, Sasaram
 G.S. Residential School, Malwar Road, Sasaram
 St. Jeelani's Public School, Shahjuma, Sasaram
 Pragya Niketan Public School, Falzalganj, Sasaram
 Buddha Mission School, Nooranganj, Bauliya Road, Sasaram Rohtas Bihar

Villages 
Besides the city of Sasaram itself, there are 171 villages in Sasaram block, of which 144 are inhabited and 27 are uninhabited. The total rural population of Sasaram block is 210,875, in 34,336 households.

Notable people
 Sher Shah Suri: Emperor of India, conquered Mughal Empire defeating 2nd Mughal emperor Humayun.
 Chhedi Paswan, Member Of Indian Parliament, Ex- MLA
 Babu Jagjivan Ram: former Deputy Prime Minister of India
 Meira Kumar: former Speaker of the Lok Sabha of India
 Vijay Kumar: Renowned biologist
 Rameshwar Singh Kashyap, Bhojpuri playwright and author.
 Akash Deep, Indian cricketer, a squad member of Royal Challengers Bangalore in Indian Premier League.
 Ritesh Pandey, Bhojpuri actor and singer
 Kavi Kumar Azad: famous for his role in TV serial Taarak Mehta Ka Ooltah Chashmah as Dr. Hansraj Hathi
 Jyoti Prakash Nirala: recipient of Ashok Chakra posthumously in 2018

See also
 Shergarh Fort

References

External links

 

Cities and towns in Rohtas district